Mamaroneck   is a village in Westchester County, New York, United States. The population was 18,929 at the 2010 census.  its population was an estimated 19,131. It is located partially within the town of Mamaroneck and partially within the town of Rye. The portion in Rye is unofficially called "Rye Neck". The Rye Neck Union Free School District contains the Rye Neck portion of Mamaroneck and part of the city of Rye.

History
Originally,  the farming community of Mamaroneck was located on two sides of the Mamaroneck River. In the 1890s, the two areas surrounding the river were joined into one commercial village, Mamaroneck, which was incorporated in 1895. The eastern side of the village lies in the town of Rye and is known as Rye Neck. Some controversy surrounded the incorporation of the village, but the State Appellate Court approved the village's election status. The population of Mamaroneck village in 1895 was 1,500.

Along with the other shore communities of Westchester, Mamaroneck was at one time the location of summer residences for wealthy families from New York City. Summer residence neighborhoods included Greenhaven, Orienta and Shore Acres. The local railroad from New York City (now Metro-North)  began to serve the village in 1848. Currently, the village of Mamaroneck is a commuter town for individuals working in Manhattan. A harbor on the Long Island Sound supports facilities for pleasure boating and is the location of Harbor Island Park, a large public park with beach and sporting facilities.

The main commercial streets in Mamaroneck are the Boston Post Road (U.S. Route 1) and Mamaroneck Avenue, the site of several annual parades. Local industry is centered on Fenimore Road.

Other areas of the town include Heathcote Hill, overlooking the harbor, Harbor Heights (the heights) to the northeast, Old Rye Neck (settled in the 1880s), Rye Neck (settled in the 1920s and 1930s), Orienta, and Washingtonville, better known as "The Flats", due to the flat, low-lying topography of the area.

Historic sites on National register of Historic Places (NRHP)
 Mamaroneck Methodist Church 
 St. Thomas' Episcopal Church Complex 
 Walter's Hot Dog Stand 
 Mamaroneck's "Skinny House" 
 Albert E. and Emily Wilson House

Geography

Demographics

As of the census of 2010, there were 18,929 people living in the village. The racial makeup of the village was 65.3% White, 3.7% Black or African American, 0.1% Native American, 4.8% Asian, 0.03% Pacific Islander, 0.4% from other races, and 1.4% from two or more races. Hispanic or Latino of any race were 24.3% of the population.

There were 6,920 households, out of which 35.4% had children under the age of 18 living with them, 52.3% were married couples living together, 10.9% had a female householder with no husband present, and 33.6% were non-families. 28.1% of all households were made up of individuals, and 11.4% had someone living alone who was 65 years of age or older.  The average household size was 2.66 and the average family size was 3.28.

In the village, the population was spread out, with 24% under the age of 18, 6.5% from 18 to 24, 32.0% from 25 to 44, 22.2% from 45 to 64, and 16.1% who were 65 years of age or older.  The median age was 40.2 years. For every 100 females, there were 92.0 males.  For every 100 females age 18 and over, there were 88.2 males.

The median income for a household in the village was $86,307, and the median income for a family was $97,813. Males had a median income of $65,2563 versus $56,353 for females. The per capita income for the village was $52,750. About 4.2% of families and 6.9% of the population were below the poverty line, including 6.7% of those under age 18 and 9.0% of those age 65 or over.

Nationalities 
Mamaroneck Village residents represent more than 70 nationalities, including 30 from Europe, 20 from Latin America, seven from Asia and six from the Middle East, and five from Africa, according to the U.S. Census Bureau’s American Community Survey for 2015-19, via the National Historical Geographic Information System (nhgis.org) and detailed on the Mamaroneck Historical Society's website.

Largest nationalities 
As of 2019, the top 10 nationalities by size and their estimated village population were:

 Italian: 4,131
 Irish: 2,261
 Guatemalan: 1,505
 American (United States): 1,111
 German: 1,087
 Mexican: 911
 English: 869
 Puerto Rican: 648
 French: 517
 Peruvian: 476

About one-third of survey respondents who reported ancestry reported multiple ancestries. Sixteen percent didn’t report ancestry or their answer was unclassified in one of the groups the Census Bureau listed.

Fastest growing nationalities 
The 10 nationalities that grew fastest in Mamaroneck Village from 2010 to 2019 were:

 Guatemalan: +647, to a population of 1,505 in 2019 
 Irish: +466, to 2,261
 Japanese: +211, to 474
 English: +184, to 869
 Sudanese: +164, to 164
 El Salvadoran: +163, to 328
 Dominican Republic: +140, to 239
 French: +120, to 517
 Brazilian: +117, to 322
 Hungarian: +94, to 211

Education
The Village of Mamaroneck contains portions of two public school districts.  As noted above, the northern and eastern parts of the village form part of the Rye Neck Union Free School District; the other part of the Rye Neck Union Free School District lies in the southern portion of the city of Rye. The southern and western parts of the village form part of the Mamaroneck Union Free School District; the remainder of the Mamaroneck Union Free School District covers all of the village of Larchmont, as well as most of the Town of Mamaroneck's unincorporated areas.

Private schools:
 French-American School of New York
 Westchester Hebrew High School

Fire Department
The village of Mamaroneck is protected by five all-volunteer fire companies of the Village of Mamaroneck Fire Department (VMFD) that operate out of four fire stations, located throughout the village. The combined volunteer fire companies operate a total of five engines (including one spare engine), two trucks, two utility units and three command vehicles. The combined volunteer fire companies respond to approximately 1,000 emergency calls annually.

Fire station locations and apparatus

Mayors

 Tom Murphy, 2017–present
 Norman Rosenblum, 2009–2017
 Kathy Savolt, 2007–2009
 Philip Trifiletti, 2001–2007
 Deborah Chapin, 1999–2001
 Joseph Lanza, 1994–1999
 Paul Noto, 1985–1994
 Robert Funicello 1985
 Suzi Oppenheimer 1977–1985
 Arthur C. Phillips, 1965–1977
 Alexander Schwab, 1957–1964
 Edwin B. Dooley, 1950–1956
 Battista Santoro, ?–1950

Economy
 Archie Comics is headquartered in the village and the town of Mamaroneck.
 Marval Industries is a manufacturer of plastics, employing about 70 people. It is one of a very few businesses along Metro-North Railroad's New Haven Line having an active siding for freight usage.

Notable people
 James Fenimore Cooper lived in Mamaroneck
 Kevin Dillon grew up in Mamaroneck
 Matt Dillon grew up in Mamaroneck
 Edwin B. Dooley, former US Congressman
 Henry Flagler, oil, hotels and railroad baron, circa 1877
 Cat Greenleaf, News Reporter and Host of NBC's Talk Stoop
 D. W. Griffith, silent film director, lived in Mamaroneck for a few years in the 1920s
 William Kunstler, radical lawyer and civil rights activist; lived on West Street
 Scott Leius (baseball player) lived in Mamaroneck
 Robert Ripley had a home on BION (Believe It Or Not) Island 
 Norman Rockwell lived in Mamaroneck
 David Spinozza (Studio guitarist, producer, and conductor) grew up in Mamaroneck Lane
 Lee Stringer, author, longtime and current resident
 Gary Young, first drummer of the '90s alternative band Pavement

Local points of interest
 Emelin Theatre
 Most Holy Trinity Church
 Mamaroneck Riot 
 Battle of Mamaroneck 
 Mamaroneck Union Free School District 
 Rye Neck Union Free School District 
 Mamaroneck High School 
 Rye Neck High School 
 St. Vito's Church 
 Mamaroneck Public Library 
 Mamaroneck (Metro-North station)
 One Room School House
 Cooper/DeLancey House (1811)
 Mile Marker 23
 Sal's Pizza

Cemeteries
 DeLancey Burial Ground
 Disbrow Burial Ground
 Eleazor Gedney Burial Ground
 Florence-Powell Burial Ground
 Griffen Rogers Burial Ground
 Guion Burial Ground
 Richbell Cemetery
 Solomon Gedney Burial Ground
 Old Town of Mamaroneck Cemetery

Source:

See also
 The Customart Press
 Rye Brook
 Port Chester

Notes

References

External links

 Village of Mamaroneck official website
 Larchmont Mamaroneck Community Television
Mamaroneck Historical Society

Mamaroneck, New York
Rye, New York
Villages in New York (state)
Villages in Westchester County, New York
Populated coastal places in New York (state)